"She Wants to Move" is a single by American hip hop and rock group N*E*R*D from their second studio album, Fly or Die (2004). It was written by Pharrell Williams and Chad Hugo and released on February 9, 2004, as the album's lead single. The song peaked at number six on the US Billboard Hot Dance Club Play chart and achieved mainstream success outside the United States, peaking within the top ten on the charts of Denmark, the Netherlands, Norway and the United Kingdom. It received substantial airplay on MTV.

In Australia the song was ranked number 63 on Triple J's Hottest 100 of 2004. The video for the song features British singer, rapper and television personality Alesha Dixon. This song was featured in a party scene in the movie Coach Carter, as well as in an episode of Six Feet Under, "The Black Forest."

Remixes
In 2005, Hitch featured the Mac & Toolz remix of this song in the film, but it was not included on the soundtrack album.

Amongst the other remixes were one by the record label DFA Records which featured in the movie and soundtrack of The Fast and the Furious: Tokyo Drift as well as a Native Tongue remix, which features guest spots by Common, Mos Def, De La Soul and Q-Tip. Basement Jaxx also remixed the song which was included as a B-side on the follow-up single "Maybe". The song was also remixed by French DJs Justice in 2004. In 2016, Boys Noize presented a presumable remix from Daft Punk, but they confirmed that it was fake.

Track listings

US DVD single
 "She Wants to Move" (music video) – 3:30
 "She Wants to Move" (Native Tongue remix featuring Common, Mos Def, De La Soul and Q-Tip) – 4:44
 "She Wants to Move" (Beenie Man feat. Ms. Thing vs. N*E*R*D) – 4:46
 "She Wants to Move" (Basement Jaxx dub) – 4:14

Canadian and European CD single, UK CD1
 "She Wants to Move" (album version) – 3:33
 "Rock Star" (Jason Nevins remix edit) – 3:48

UK CD2
 "She Wants to Move" (album version) – 3:33
 "She Wants to Move" (DFA remix) – 7:38
 "She Wants to Move" (Mac & Toolz remix) – 3:49
 "She Wants to Move" (video) – 3:30

Australian CD single
 "She Wants to Move" (album version) – 3:33
 "She Wants to Move" (DFA remix) – 7:38
 "Rock Star" (Jason Nevins remix edit) – 3:48

Charts

Weekly charts

Year-end charts

Certifications

Release history

References

2004 singles
2004 songs
Music videos directed by Dave Meyers (director)
N.E.R.D. songs
Song recordings produced by the Neptunes
Songs written by Chad Hugo
Songs written by Pharrell Williams
Virgin Records singles